Jon Birger is an American freelance writer, speaker and author of Date-Onomics: How Dating Became a Lopsided Numbers Game.

Career
A business journalist, Birger is a former senior writer at Fortune and Money magazines and continues to contribute to Fortune. He has contributed to Barron’s, Bloomberg BusinessWeek, New York, Time, and The Washington Post.

References

Living people
American business and financial journalists
American business writers
American financial commentators
American magazine editors
American newspaper editors
American magazine staff writers
Journalists from Massachusetts
Year of birth missing (living people)